Channel 3 or TV 3  may refer to:

Television
Canal 3 (Burkina Faso), a commercial television channel in Burkina Faso
Canal 3 (Guatemala), a commercial television channel in Guatemala
Channel 3 (Algeria), a public Algerian TV channel owned by EPTV Group
Channel 3 (Bulgaria), a Bulgarian TV station
Channel 3 (Cambodia), a Cambodian TV station
Channel 3 (Iran), channel of Islamic Republic of Iran Broadcasting
Channel 3 (Thailand), a commercial station
TV3 (Catalonia), a regional public Catalan television channel owned by CCMA
TV3 (Czech Republic), defunct regional general entertainment channel
TV3, a local television in Tangerang, Indonesia
TV3 (Malaysian TV network), a privately owned network
Three (TV channel), a New Zealand station formerly named TV3
TV3 (Hungary), defunct television channel
TV3 (Switzerland), defunct television channel
TV3 (Viasat), a brand name of Nordic Entertainment Group's flagship entertainment TV channel, with several European national channels, including:
TV3 (Denmark)
TV3 (Norway)
TV3 Slovenia, a defunct television channel owned by Modern Times Group (MTG) in Sweden until its closedown in 2012
TV3 (Sweden)
 TV3 Group (Baltics), a pan-Baltic commercial broadcasting company owned by Providence Equity Partners through Bitė Group in Lithuania, previously a part of Viasat operations
TV3 (Estonia)
TV3 (Latvia)
TV3 (Lithuania)
TV-3 (Russia), a privately owned station
TVR3, a Romanian television channel, featuring classic movies.
TV3 Ghana, a privately owned station
TV3 Winchester, cable-only ABC affiliate in Winchester, Virginia
Channel 3 – Rosario, Argentine TV station
Canal 3 Colonia, Uruguayan TV station
BBC Three, a British television channel from the BBC
Hot 3, formerly Channel 3 in Israel
ITV (TV network), British commercial public broadcast network legally named Channel 3
ITV Tyne Tees, previously known as Channel 3 North East from 1996–1998
Medford Community Cablevision, Inc., a public-access station
MTV3, a commercial station in Finland
NPO 3, a public-broadcasting station in Nederland 
NBN Television (Australia), originally known as Channel 3
Rai 3, an Italian television channel
South African Broadcasting Corporation TV 3, a channel operated by the state-owned broadcaster 1975–1996
Imagen Televisión, which uses virtual channel 3 in Mexico
Virgin Media Television (Republic of Ireland), formerly TV3 Group
Virgin Media One, formerly TV3

Other uses
Channel 3 (band) – 1980s punk band from Cerritos, California
Channel 3/4 output, a channel option provided to video cassette recorders, early DVD players and video game consoles
Vanguard TV3, a US satellite in 1957

See also
 Lists of television channels
 Channel 3 branded TV stations in the United States
 Channel 3 virtual TV stations in Canada
 Channel 3 virtual TV stations in the United States
For VHF frequencies covering 60-66 MHz:
 Channel 3 TV stations in Canada
 Channel 3 TV stations in Mexico
 Channel 3 digital TV stations in the United States
 Channel 3 low-power TV stations in the United States

03

es:TV3